Coringa Wildlife Sanctuary is an estuary situated near Kakinada in Andhra Pradesh, India. 
It is the third largest stretch of mangrove forests in India with 24 mangrove tree species and more than 120 bird species. It is home to the critically endangered  white-backed vulture and the long billed vulture. Mangroves are a group of trees and shrubs that live in the coastal intertidal zone, with a dense tangle of prop roots that make the trees appear to be standing on stilts above the water. This tangle of roots allows the trees to handle the daily rise and fall of tides; hence, the mangrove forest gets flooded at least twice per day. The roots also slow the movement of tidal waters, causing sediments to settle out of the water and build up the muddy bottom.

It also stabilizes the coastline, reducing erosion from storm surges, currents, waves, and tides. The intricate root system of the mangrove also makes the forest attractive to fish and other organisms seeking food and shelter from predators.

Geography
Coringa Wildlife Sanctuary is 
8 km from the port city of Kakinada, on the Kakinada-Yanam National Highway 216 in Chollangi Village, nestling on the deltaic branches of Gouthami and Godavari Rivers at Kakinada Bay.

It is located between 16°-30' to 17°-00' N latitudes and 82°-14' to 82°-23'E longitudes.

The sanctuary is a part of the Godavari estuary and has extensive mangrove and dry deciduous tropical forest.

About half of the area is the backwater, which includes a sand pit of 18 km length. The rivers Coringa and Gaderu and their deltaic branches intersect the region, along with other water channels. This forms about 335.7 square km of marsh vegetation.

The average temperature of the region is 17 °C to 40 °C.

Average Rainfall is greater than 1,000 mm.

Flora
The Sanctuary in the estuary of River Godavari has rich mangrove vegetation. There are thirty five species of plants belonging to twenty four families. The plant species that are commonly found are:

 Avicennia officinalis
 Avicennia marina
 Avicennia alba
 Excoecaria agallocha
 Rhizophora mucronata
 Ceriops decandra
 Bruguiera gymnorhiza
 Lumnitzera recemosa
 Sonneratia apetala
 Rhizophora conjugata
 Aegiceras corniculatum
 Thespesia populneoides
 Hibiscus tiliaceus.

Apart from the tree species, some of the shrubs found in the sanctuary are:

 Dalbergia spinosa
 Derris trifoliata.

Herbs like:

 Sesuvium portulacastrum
 Suaeda maritima
 Suaeda monoica
 Salicornia brachiatta

and grasses like:

 Aeluropus lagopoides
 Porteresia coarctate
 Myriostachya wightiana

are found in the sanctuary.

Fauna

The sanctuary possesses a wide variety of birds, because of the feed available in the backwaters of the mangrove forest. During low tide, some of the areas are exposed (elevated mud flats) having small fishes, shrimps and mollusks. These attract avifauna for feeding. Some critically endangered species like the white-backed vulture and the long billed vulture are present in the sanctuary. The painted stork, Oriental white ibis, ferruginous pochard found in the sanctuary are near threatened species, and spot-billed pelican is a vulnerable species. Significant populations of waders and mangrove birds are also present. Altogether, more than 120 species of birds have been reported and among them some of the commonly found birds in the sanctuary are:

 little egret
 cattle egret
 pied kingfisher
 small blue kingfisher
 black-capped kingfisher
 pond heron
 reef heron
 grey heron
 night heron
 little stint
 sandpiper
 redshank
 red-wattled lapwing
 crow pheasant
 flamingos
 sea gulls
 purple heron
 brahmini kite
 openbill stork
 little cormorant.

Apart from the avian fauna, the sanctuary has a fair population of golden jackal, sea turtle and fishing cat, and a healthy breeding population of smooth-coated otter. The sanctuary has an 18-km long sand pit where olive ridley sea turtles nest from January to March every year. Efforts to reintroduce the saltwater crocodile into the sanctuary during the 1970s met with failure and the species has not been present within the sanctuary for over 30 years.

Threats and conservation issues
As it is easy to access and in close vicinity to the port town of Kakinada and nearby villages, which are largely inhabited, the mangroves are being exploited by the local population. A socio-economic study by the Indian Bird Conservation Network found that most of the local fishermen harvest wood in the forest and depend heavily on the mangroves for their basic needs. The species Avicennia officinalis and Avicennia marina are being used for fuelwood.

The existence of otters has been hit badly because of increased poaching and habitat destruction. The increasing industrialization of the Godavari Delta, increasing aquaculture activities and fishing pressure have severely affected the population of otters. The Andhra Pradesh Forest Department has taken steps to ensure conservation of otters and for afforestation of mangroves in the sanctuary.

References

Wildlife sanctuaries in Andhra Pradesh
Kakinada
1978 establishments in Andhra Pradesh
Protected areas established in 1978